David S. Mann is the Chief Judge of the Washington Court of Appeals, Division I.

Biography 
Judge David S. Mann was appointed to Division I of the Washington State Court of Appeals by Governor Jay Inslee in August 2016, and ran unopposed to retain his seat in November 2017. Judge Mann is currently serving as the Acting Chief Judge for Division I and is a member of the Washington Board of Judicial Administration. Mann ran for re-election for the Division I District 1 judge of the Washington Court of Appeals. He won in the general election on November 3, 2020.

References

Washington Court of Appeals judges
University of California, Santa Barbara alumni
Lewis & Clark Law School alumni
Year of birth missing (living people)
Living people